The 2016–17 season was the 117th season in Società Sportiva Lazio's history and their 29th consecutive season in the top-flight of Italian football. Lazio competed in Serie A, finishing fifth, and in the Coppa Italia, where they finished as runners-up to Juventus, losing the final 2–0.

Following the extremely brief tenure of Marcelo Bielsa during pre-season, Simone Inzaghi, who had acted as interim coach following Stefano Pioli's sacking in the second half of the 2015–16 season, assumed the post permanently.

New signing Ciro Immobile finished as the club's top scorer with 23 goals in Serie A and 26 in total.

Players

Squad information

Transfers

In

Out

Pre-season and friendlies

Competitions

Serie A

League table

Results summary

Results by round

Matches

Coppa Italia

Statistics

Appearances and goals

|-
! colspan="14" style="background:#B2FFFF; text-align:center"| Goalkeepers

|-
! colspan="14" style="background:#B2FFFF; text-align:center"| Defenders

|-
! colspan="14" style="background:#B2FFFF; text-align:center"| Midfielders

|-
! colspan="14" style="background:#B2FFFF; text-align:center"| Forwards

|-
! colspan="14" style="background:#B2FFFF; text-align:center"| Players transferred out during the season

Goalscorers

Last updated: 28 May 2017

Clean sheets

Last updated: 28 May 2017

Disciplinary record

Last updated: 28 May 2017

References

S.S. Lazio seasons
Lazio